Freeze Corleone, pseudonym of Issa Lorenzo Diakhaté, born June 6, 1992 in Lilas, Seine-Saint-Denis, is a French rapper, singer-songwriter and producer. He is also the founder of the collective 667, and CFR (with Norsacce and Osirus Jack). He lived part of his life in Canada and lives in Dakar, Senegal.

Early life 
Corleone was born in Les Lilas in Seine-Saint-Denis to a Senegalese father and an Italian mother. In an interview with Les Inrocks, he claims to have spent his early years in Pantin, before attending high school in Dakar, Senegal.

Discography

Albums

Mixtapes

In Group

Notable Collaboration

References 

French rappers
Rappers from Paris
1992 births
Living people